Jet Services V was a 75-foot waterline length catamaran that was sailed across the Atlantic ocean in 1988 and 1990.

See also
List of multihulls
Jet Services II

References

Individual catamarans
1980s sailing yachts